The 2020–21 FC Lokomotiv Moscow season was the club's 96th season in existence and the club's 25th consecutive season in the top flight of Russian football. In addition to the domestic league, Lokomotiv Moscow participated in this season's editions of the Russian Cup, the Russian Super Cup, and participated in the UEFA Champions League. The season covered the period from 7 August 2020 to 30 June 2021.

Players

First team squad

Out on loan

Transfers

In

Out

Pre-season and friendlies

Competitions

Overview

Premier League

League table

Results summary

Results by round

Matches

Russian Cup

Russian Super Cup

UEFA Champions League

Group stage

The group stage draw was held on 1 October 2020.

Statistics

Goalscorers

Notes

References

External links

FC Lokomotiv Moscow seasons
Lokomotiv Moscow
Lokomotiv Moscow